The 2015–16 Major Arena Soccer League season is the eighth season for the league and the second since six teams from the former Major Indoor Soccer League defected to what was formerly called the Professional Arena Soccer League. The regular season started on October 24, 2015, and ended on March 4, 2016. Each team played a 20-game schedule. It was also the 38th season of professional indoor soccer in the United States.

Teams
Many of the 22 teams that completed the 2014–15 season returned for the 2015–16 season. Teams not returning this season include Rochester Lancers, Wichita B-52s, Tulsa Revolution, and Monterrey Flash. In April 2015, Baltimore Blast owner Ed Hale announced that his team was withdrawing from the MASL to form a new league. No other teams announced their departure and the proposed new league never formed. The Blast quietly rejoined the league after agreeing to pay a fine. The Detroit Waza relocated to Flint, Michigan, and are operating this season as simply Waza Flo.

The expansion Sonora Suns based in Hermosillo, Connecticut-based Hartford City FC, Iowa-based Cedar Rapids Rampage, and Tijuana-based Atletico Baja were formally accepted for membership in the MASL. The fledgling Youngstown Nighthawks based in Ohio aimed to join the league but encountered financial issues.

On October 28, 2015, the MASL announced that Hartford City FC would not be permitted to enter the league this season and began league-wide schedule changes to replace the failed franchise. A new ownership group hoped to revive the team for the 2016–17 season.

Unlike last season where some Eastern Division teams played with a variable-point scoring system, for 2015–16 the whole MASL will play with standard soccer scoring using goals, not points.

Standings
As of March 4, 2016

(Bold) Division Winner

Eastern Conference

Western Conference

2016 Ron Newman Cup

Playoff format
Top three finishers in each division qualify for the playoffs. The winner of the playoff between the second and third place teams will play the first place team for the division title.

Each round (including the Newman Cup Championship) will be a home and away series. Teams that win both games will advance. If the wins are split between the two teams, a fifteen-minute mini game will be played immediately after the second game to break the tie. The only exception will be the Eastern Division Semi-Final, where there will be a one-game playoff (Syracuse hosting Waza Flo) because of arena availability issues.

Eastern Conference Playoffs

Eastern Division Semi-Final

Syracuse advances to the Eastern Division Final.

Eastern Division Final

Baltimore wins series 2–0.

Central Division Semi-Final

Milwaukee wins series 2–1.

Central Division Final

Missouri wins series 2–0.

Eastern Conference Final

Baltimore wins series 2–0

Western Conference Playoffs

Southwest Division Semi-Final

Brownsville wins series 2–0

Southwest Division Final

Las Vegas wins series 2–0

Pacific Division Semi-Final

San Diego wins series 2–0

Pacific Division Final

Sonora wins series 2–1.

Western Conference Final

Sonora wins series 2–1.

Newman Cup Championship

Baltimore wins Newman Cup 2–0.

Statistics

Top scorers
Last updated on March 4, 2016. Source:

Awards

Individual Awards

All-League First Team

All-League Second Team

All-League Third Team

All-Rookie Team

References

External links
MASL official website

 
Major Arena Soccer League
Major Arena Soccer League
Major Arena Soccer League seasons